Odontotrema is a genus of fungi in the family Odontotremataceae.

Species
As accepted by Species Fungorum;
Odontotrema phacidioides 
Odontotrema stereocaulicola 

It has many former species;
 O. affine  = Sporormiella affinis, Sporormiaceae
 O. alpinum  = Sphaeropezia alpina, Odontotremataceae
 O. alpinum var. octopartitum  = Sphaeropezia alpina, Odontotremataceae
 O. anodontum  = Mycowinteria anodonta, Protothelenellaceae
 O. belonosporum  = Coccomycetella belonospora, Odontotremataceae
 O. bryoriae  = Sphaeropezia bryoriae, Odontotremataceae
 O. cassiopes  = Sphaeropezia cassiopes, Odontotremataceae
 O. concentricum  = Ocellularia concentrica, Graphidaceae
 O. cuculare  = Sphaeropezia cucularis, Odontotremataceae
 O. figulinum  = Sphaeropezia figulina, Odontotremataceae
 O. firmatum  = Exarmidium hemisphaericum, Hyponectriaceae
 O. hemisphaericum  = Exarmidium hemisphaericum, Hyponectriaceae
 O. inclusum  = Exarmidium inclusum, Hyponectriaceae
 O. inclusum subsp. affine  = Sporormiella affinis, Sporormiaceae
 O. inclusum var. affine  = Sporormiella affinis, Sporormiaceae
 O. intermedium  = Sphaeropezia intermedia, Odontotremataceae
 O. japewiae  = Sphaeropezia japewiae, Odontotremataceae
 O. lecanorae  = Sphaeropezia lecanorae, Odontotremataceae
 O. longius  = Durella atrocyanea, Helotiaceae
 O. majus  = Exarmidium inclusum, Hyponectriaceae
 O. melaneliae  = Sphaeropezia melaneliae, Odontotremataceae
 O. minus sensu auct. brit. = Exarmidium hemisphaericum, Hyponectriaceae
 O. navarinoi  = Sphaeropezia navarinoi, Odontotremataceae
 O. ochrolechiae  = Sphaeropezia ochrolechiae, Odontotremataceae
 O. pertusariae  = Sphaeropezia pertusariae, Odontotremataceae
 O. pini  = Cryptodiscus pini, Stictidaceae
 O. plantagineum  = Trochila plantaginea, Cenangiaceae
 O. rhaphidosporum  = Odontura rhaphidospora, Odontotremataceae
 O. rhizocarpicola  = Sphaeropezia rhizocarpicola, Odontotremataceae
 O. rhopalospermum  = Phragmiticola phragmitis, Marthamycetaceae
 O. santessonii  = Sphaeropezia santessonii, Odontotremataceae
 O. sieversiae  = Phacidium sieversiae, Phacidiaceae
 O. sipei  = Sphaeropezia sipei, Odontotremataceae
 O. subintegrum  = Exarmidium inclusum, Hyponectriaceae
 O. thamnoliae  = Sphaeropezia thamnoliae, Odontotremataceae

References

Ostropales
Ostropales genera
Taxa named by William Nylander (botanist)